Charles Titus (January 1, 1838 - March 26, 1921) was an American soldier who received the Medal of Honor for valor during the American Civil War.

Biography
Titus joined the 1st New Jersey Cavalry in August 1861. He received the Medal of Honor on July 3, 1865 for his actions at the Battle of Sayler's Creek, and mustered out with his regiment in later that same month.

He died at his home in Belmar, New Jersey on March 26, 1921.

Medal of Honor citation
Citation:

Was among the first to check the enemy's countercharge.

See also

List of American Civil War Medal of Honor recipients: T-Z

References

External links

Military Times

1838 births
1921 deaths
Union Army soldiers
United States Army Medal of Honor recipients
People from Millstone, New Jersey
American Civil War recipients of the Medal of Honor